Étoile Charleville-Mézières (in English: Charleville-Mézières Star)  is a French professional basketball club, that is based in Charleville-Mézières. The team currently plays in the Nationale masculine 2 (4th division of the French basketball championship)

History 
The club founded in 1921 in Charleville-Mézières. In 1958, the club moved to Charleville and after the merger of Charleville Mézières and in 1966, the association became Etoile of Charleville-Mézières. Ardenne's club disappears from the top French level, then it rises in national 2 (NM2) in 1999, NM1 in 2004 and Pro B in 2005 before declining in NM1 after the season 2005- 2006. At the end of the 2007–2008 season, the Etoile of Charleville Mézières back in Pro B being second NM1 and during the 2008–2009 season, the Etoile of Charleville Mézières surprised everyone by integrating into the play- Pro B offs while back only 1 of the National.

The club plays at the Salle Dubois-Crancé, but manages to negotiate to play matches at the Salle Bayard from 2011 onwards until a common facility with 2,903 seats is available in hall B of the exhibition center. This new hall, called Caisse d'Epargne Arena following a partnership agreement, was inaugurated in September 2015.

Ending last Pro B in the 2010–11 season, the team is demoted in NM1 but there remains one season: it is promoted in Pro B at the end of the 2011–12 season NM1 winning the final of the playoffs against Blois. The Etoile of Charleville Mézières is only one season in Pro B in NM1 and down for the 2013–14 season. But she did not stay long because for the 2014–15 season will be again in Pro B, despite the announcement of his late accession. After six wins for twenty-eight losses in the 2017-2018 French Pro B Basketball Championship, the Etoile is relegated to NM1 for the following season. In the summer of 2019, the club is administratively relegated to NM2.

Sports results

Awards 

French League 2
 Winners (1): 1954–55
French Cup
 Winners (2): 1957–58, 1958–59
French League
 Winners (2): 1957–58, 1959–60
European Champion Clubs Cup
 1/4 finals (1): 1958-59
NM1
 Vice-champion (1): 2007-08
NM1
 Play-Off Champion (1): 2011-12
NM1
 Play-Off finalist (1): 2013-14

Report by season

Players and personalities

Current roster (2022-2023)

Notable players

Coaches 

Basketball teams in France
Basketball teams established in 1921